Harold L. Brode is a nuclear-weapons-effects physicist who pioneered computer simulations of nuclear explosions at the RAND Corporation in the 1950s. In 1951, he received his PhD from Cornell University where his supervisor was Hans A. Bethe. He is co-founder of R&D Associates, Vice-President of Strategic Systems at Pacific-Sierra Research Corporation and Chairman of the U.S. Defense Nuclear Agency's Scientific Advisory Group for Effects (SAGE) .

One of his critics commented in Physics Today, vol. 58: "Harold Brode probably knows more about nuclear weapons effects than any other person alive."

Major publications
'Numerical Solution of a Spherical Blast Wave', Physical Review A, vol. 95 (1954), pages 658 et seq.
'Numerical Solutions of Spherical Blast Waves', Journal of Applied Physics, vol. 26 (1955), pages 766 et seq..
'Cratering from a Megaton Surface Burst' (with R. L. Bjork), RAND Corporation, Research memorandum RM-2600, June 20, 1960 .
'A Review of Nuclear Explosions Phenomena Pertinent to Protective Construction' RAND Corporation, R-425-PR, May 1964, pages 63.

External links
RAND Corporation's list of unclassified (non-secret) reports by Harold Brode 
Some online links to Brode's blast and cratering analysis 

21st-century American physicists
Living people
Cornell University alumni
Year of birth missing (living people)